Yoale may refer to:
Yoal, a type of boat
Yoel (or יוֹאֵל), a Hebrew equivalent of the name Joel